Albertus Johannes van der Merwe (14 July 1929 – 23 November 1971) was a South African rugby union player.

Playing career
Van der Merwe was born in Rawsonville and received his schooling at Worcester Gymnasium.

Van der Merwe made his test match debut for the Springboks against the British Lions in 1955. He then toured with the Springboks to Australia and New Zealand in 1956 and played in all six test matches during the tour. He also played in tests against  in 1958,  in 1960 and his last test was against the All Blacks in 1960. Van der Merwe also played in fourteen tour matches and scored one try.

Test history

See also
List of South Africa national rugby union players – Springbok no. 323

References

1929 births
1971 deaths
South African rugby union players
South Africa international rugby union players
Boland Cavaliers players
People from Breede Valley Local Municipality
Rugby union players from the Western Cape
Rugby union hookers